Parnell Township is the name of some places in the U.S. state of Minnesota:
Parnell Township, Polk County, Minnesota
Parnell Township, Traverse County, Minnesota

Minnesota township disambiguation pages